The Whatcom County Council, the legislative body of Whatcom County, Washington, consists of seven members, five elected by district and two elected at large.  The Council adopts laws, sets policy, and holds final approval over the budget.

Councilmembers 
All elective offices in Whatcom County are officially nonpartisan. Following the 2015 election, the council districts have changed; the districts listed here are districts which each member was elected to.

Meetings 
The County Council meets biweekly at 7:00 p.m. on every other Tuesday. Meetings are held in the County Council chambers, on the first floor of the Whatcom County Courthouse located at 311 Grand Avenue in downtown Bellingham.

Structure 
Five Councilmembers are elected by district to four-year terms. Councilmembers in districts 1, 2, and 3 are up for election in 2025, while Councilmembers in districts 4 and 5 are up for election in 2023. There are two at-large seats, also elected to four-year terms. At-large seat A is up for election in 2025, while at-large seat B is up for election in 2023.

Prior to 2015, the council was elected following three districts with two seats each, and one at large member. This changed upon the passage of Charter Amendment Proposition 9 by voters in 2015, which change the council from three districts to five. Also in 2015, the passage of Charter Amendment Proposition 1 changed the method of election in the general election from county-wide voting to district-only voting. Previously, primary elections for council seats were decided on by voters within each district, but the during the general election the entire county could vote on each race. Following 2015, only voters within each district get to vote for the candidates running for that district's seat. As before, the at-large seats are voted on by the entire county.

The Whatcom County Executive is not a member of the council, and is a separately elected official. The Executive submits legislation to the council for consideration. The Executive has veto power over ordinances passed by the council. The Council requires a vote of five of the seven council members to override the Executive's veto.

Charter Review 
Whatcom County became a home rule county in 1978, governed by a county charter. Every 10 years, a Charter Review Commission is formed to review the charter and recommend charter amendments, which then must be voted on by the citizens of the county. The most recent charter review was in 2015.

Notable past council members 
 Ken Mann, council member 2010–2018, co-host on Bellingham radio station KGMI.
 Carl Weimer, council member 2006–2018, former executive director of RE Sources for Sustainable Communities, a Bellingham-based non-profit environmental advocacy group.
 Pete Kremen, council member 2012–2016, Whatcom County Executive 1996–2012, Member of the Washington House of Representatives from the 42nd district 1985–1996.

References

External links
Whatcom County Council

Whatcom County, Washington
County government in Washington (state)